Microcephalopsini is a tribe of big-headed flies (insects in the family Pipunculidae).

Genera
Collinias Aczél, 1940
Microcephalops De Meyer, 1989

References

Pipunculidae
Brachycera tribes